Marie, Ltd. is a 1919 silent film romantic comedy directed by Kenneth S. Webb and starring Alice Brady. It was produced and distributed by the Select Pictures Corporation.

This film survives in the Archives Du Film Fu CNC, Bois d'Arcy, Paris.

Cast
 Alice Brady - Drina Hilliard
 Frank Losee - Colonel Lambert
 Leslie Austin - Blair Carson
 Mrs. Gertrude Hillman - Marie Hilliard
 Josephine Whittell - Adelaide
 Gladys Valerie - Zelie

References

External links

lobby poster

1919 films
American silent feature films
American black-and-white films
Films directed by Kenneth Webb
1910s American films